Eugoa eeckei is a moth of the family Erebidae. It is found on Sulawesi.

References

 Natural History Museum Lepidoptera generic names catalog

eeckei
Moths described in 1922